China Gate is a 1957 American CinemaScope war film written, produced and directed by Samuel Fuller and released through 20th Century Fox. The film is set during the First Indochina War (1946–1954), and depicts the relationship between a sergeant of the French Foreign Legion and the Eurasian wife whom he had abandoned.

Plot
Sergeant Brock (Gene Barry) and Goldie (Nat King Cole) are American Korean War veterans now serving as French Foreign Legion mercenaries in the First Indochina War. Brock's wife is a "half caste" Chinese-European named "Lucky Legs" (Angie Dickinson) who resorts to smuggling to feed her five-year-old son she had with Brock. Brock abandoned her and the baby when he was born with Asian features, feeling a "half breed" would not be welcome in America; an attitude towards miscegenation prevalent at the time. Lucky is recruited by the French high command to use her expertise of the area and her connection to the communist Major Cham (Lee Van Cleef) to get a demolition squad of Legionnaires led by Brock to a vital hidden Viet Minh ammunition dump on the border with Red China. In return for her services, Lucky is promised by the French that they will arrange for her five-year-old son's emigration to America.

The raid is filled with animosity between the former lovers, booby traps, and enemy patrols. On arrival at the ammunition dump hidden in a mountain, Lucky discovers the commanding officer is her former friend, Major Cham, who wants to take her and her son to a new life in Moscow. Cham is a high flyer corporate executive (in the manner of Fuller's gangsters in Underworld USA) marked for great things in the world of international communism. The sabotage mission is successful but at great cost, as Lucky dies blowing up the dump. Brock reconciles with his child and is last seen walking along holding his hand in preparation for returning to America, as Goldie reprises the title song.

Production
Fuller selected singer Cole after being impressed with his face on a record album cover.  Though Darryl F. Zanuck said Cole received more money in a few weeks than the entire budget of the film, Fuller arranged to meet Cole. Cole and his wife were interested in Goldie as an opposite to the racist Brock and agreed to work at a minimum salary.

An actual Eurasian actress playing a love interest opposite a white European star was a rarity in Hollywood at the time. Dickinson proves attractive to Brock, and to mainstream audiences of the time. Her character is allowed to express Fuller's view on race relations and is respected both by the French military and by a local priest whose life she had saved. (The character takes a role similar to Fuller's prostitute protagonists in Pickup on South Street and The Naked Kiss). The dangerous patrol allows for a gradual change of heart for Brock.

Soundtrack
China Gate was the last score Victor Young composed; the film was finished by his friend Max Steiner. Harold Adamson wrote lyrics to Young's beautiful theme for the film.  Though originally not intending to sing in the film, Cole sang China Gate as he walked through a bombed out village followed by Brock's little son, making it a memorable tune and a fitting tribute to Young.

Banned in France
Before China Gate was to be released, Fuller received a call from Romain Gary, the French Consul-General in Los Angeles, inviting him to lunch. Gary said the film's prologue was too harsh towards France and asked Fuller to change it. Fuller refused, but the two became firm friends with similar interests. The film was never released in France.

Many years later, Fuller filmed a story of Gary's, White Dog (1982), that Fuller and Curtis Hanson adapted for the screen.

Cast
Gene Barry as Sgt. Brock
Angie Dickinson as Lucky Legs
Nat King Cole as Goldie
Paul Dubov as Capt. Caumont
Lee Van Cleef as Maj. Cham
George Givot as Cpl. Pigalle
Gerald Milton as Pvt. Andreades
Neyle Morrow as Leung
Marcel Dalio as Father Paul
Maurice Marsac as Col. De Sars
Warren Hsieh as The Boy
Paul Busch as Cpl. Kruger
James Hong as Charlie

Video releases
China Gate was released on DVD and Blu-ray Disc by Mongrel Media on March 26, 2013.

See also
 List of American films of 1957

References

 Fuller, Samuel. A Third Face, Alfred A Knopf, 2002.

External links

1957 films
American black-and-white films
American war films
1950s English-language films
Films scored by Max Steiner
Films scored by Victor Young
Films about race and ethnicity
Films directed by Samuel Fuller
Films set in 1954
Films set in Vietnam
First Indochina War films
Films about the French Foreign Legion
20th Century Fox films
CinemaScope films
Film controversies in Israel
1950s American films